Before the Day Breaks is a 2007 collaborative album from Robin Guthrie,  formerly of the Cocteau Twins, and ambient artist Harold Budd.  It was released, as a matched CD, on the same day as After the Night Falls, also by Guthrie and Budd.

In December 2007, American webzine Somewhere Cold ranked Before the Day Breaks No. 6 on their 2007 Somewhere Cold Awards Hall of Fame.

Track listing 

 "How Close Your Soul" – 7:46
 "Formless Path" – 4:23
 "Minute a Day No More" – 5:21
 "She Is My Weakness" – 3:41
 "Outside Silence" – 4:25
 "Hidden Message" – 4:48
 "I Returned Her Glance" – 3:43
 "My Monochrome Vision" – 4:44
 "Turn On the Moon" – 4:21

References 

Harold Budd albums
Robin Guthrie albums
2007 albums
Ambient albums by American artists
Ambient albums by Scottish artists